, known in North America as Shooter: Starfighter Sanvein, is a top-down, multidirectional shooter developed by Success in 2000. Players can select different floors of various complexes to do battle with various enemies and bosses. Although the story is very vague, the game involves the attempt to escape from, and ultimately destroy, a giant space station called St. Schutz, a suggestively corrupted utopia; the player controls the titular Sanvein on such an attempt by battling with the station's defense mechanisms.

Gameplay
The game is laid out in an arcade type format. The player can select one of three different elements for their ship's movement, normal and special attacks. The choices include Gluon, Photon and Graviton. The Gluon parts fire attack patterns in spread-shots while its special fired missiles, the Photon fired concentrated shots while its special unleashed a short-range laser blade and the Graviton fired explosive bullets and its special laid land mines. The player can select which floor they want to go to per stage, starting with either the Stratum, the Inner or Outer wards then leading into the Mine area and eventually the station's Core. Every floor is timed, meaning the player has to destroy every enemy on-screen before the time runs out. Whenever the player's ship is damaged, they lose time. Seconds are earned per floor depending on how quickly enemies are destroyed. When time runs out, the player has the option to start back at the mission select page at the current mission. The missions are laid out in hexagons, and each form a different shape. After all bosses are defeated, a stage boss appears. After you defeat it, you are taken to a new room.

Reception

The game received mixed to unfavorable reviews in the United States.  In Japan, Famitsu gave it a score of 23 out of 40.

References

External links
 

2000 video games
PlayStation (console) games
PlayStation Network games
Success (company) games
Multidirectional shooters
Video games developed in Japan